= Prachi Gaikwad =

Indian sports shooter

Prachi Gaikwad (born 11 January 2008) is an Indian shooter who competes in the 50m rifle 3 positions (3P) and 50m rifle prone events. She competes in the junior category under the International Shooting Sport Federation (ISSF) and is an ISSF Junior World Cup gold medalist.

== Career ==
Gaikwad made her ISSF Junior World Championships debut in Lima in 2024, finishing 19th in the 50m rifle prone, and 41st in the 50m rifle 3 positions.

In 2025, she competed at the Asian Championships in Shymkent, where she won a silver medal in the 50m rifle prone and finished 6th in the 50m rifle 3 positions.

At the Asian Rifle/Pistol Championship held in New Delhi in February 2026, Gaikwad won the individual gold medal in the junior women's 50m rifle 3 positions event in the final. She was also part of the India's junior women's team alongside Anushka Thokur and Dhavalika Devi Nyamurus.

At the ISSF Junior World Cup in Cairo in April 2026, she became the only Indian to qualify for the junior women's 3P final. She held on to win gold, beating AIN competitor Darya Chuprys. It was India's second gold medal at the competition, which took India to the top of the overall medal tally.
